The Scottish Rally Championship is a rallying series run throughout Scotland over the course of a year, that comprises seven gravel surface events.

The 2017 season began in the snow-covered forest tracks around Inverness on 18 February, with the season finale taking place around Castle Douglas on 9 September. 
Driver Jock Armstrong and regular co-driver Paula Swinscoe started the season as defending champions having won the 2016 Championship.

Aberdeen based haulage company ARR Craib sponsored the series for the fifth year in a row.

Following the Grampian Stages in August Euan Thorburn and regular co-driver Paul Beaton were declared champions in their Ford Fiesta R5. With only one event left to run the pair were uncatchable in the points table.

2017 calendar
For season 2017 there was seven events held predominantly on gravel surfaces.

Calendar changes
Due to calendar changes within the British Rally Championship, the Scottish Rally, usually held in June was brought forward to May. June, meanwhile welcomed a new event to the calendar, the Argyll Rally which saw a return to the forests of Cowal after an absence of 14 years.

2017 events podium

Notes

Drivers' championship standings

** Euan Thorburn finished second overall on the Galloway Hills Rally but, having already won the SRC title, was not registered for SRC points. This was to avoid affecting championship runner-up positions.

Points are awarded to the highest placed registered drivers on each event as follows: 30, 28, 27, 26, and so on down to 1 point. At the end of the season, competitors nominate their best 6 scores out of the 7 events as their final overall Championship score.

References

External links
 
 RSAC Scottish Rally Homepage

Scottish Rally Championship seasons
Scottish Rally Championship
Scottish Rally Championship